Donovan Wilson may refer to:

Donovan Wilson (American football) (born 1995), American football safety
Donovan Wilson (footballer) (born 1997), English footballer